The Strathpuffer is an annual amateur 24-hour winter Mountain bike race in the Scottish Highlands. The race is held in late January near Strathpeffer with around 17 hours of the race taking place in darkness. It was first held in 2006 and attracted more than 1,000 competitors in 2018.

History
The circuit is circa 12.5 kilometre route through the Torrachilty Forest, on the outskirts of Contin. Competitors can enter as a solo rider, or as part of a team of two or fours. Alternatively, schools can also enter teams of eight. Around 17 hours of the race are in darkness.

In 2016 there were over 800 participants who faced mud and snow. By that point it had established a reputation as being one of the toughest mountain bike events in the world.

In 2017 there were 6,583 laps completed by competitors. In 2018 the race attracted over 1,000 participants.

Guy Martin placed second in the male solo rider category in both 2014 and 2015.

Recent Years 
Due to its increase in popularity, it was planned for the Strathpuffer to grow by about 1.5 kilometres over 2018 and 2019, and those plans have since been put into place, making the track go from 11 kilometres to 12.5 kilometres.

In 2018 the BBC 2 show The Adventure Show covered the race and followed two teams around the course. One was a quad of girls from Dingwall Academy being mentored by the Adventure Syndicate and another was a team of two sisters calling themselves "Sister Sludge."

Results

2019 Results

2020 Results

References

External links
 
https://www.fionaoutdoors.co.uk/2019/01/strathpuffer-2019-the-toughest-yet.html
https://strathpuffer.co.uk/blog/2018-route-changes-update.asp
https://www.sundaypost.com/fp/extreme-mountain-biking-sisterssisters-show-their-mettle-in-the-gruellingstrathpuffer/
http://theadventuresyndicate.com/blog/2018/1/23/four-teenage-girls-ride-the-strathpuffer24

Cycle races in Scotland
Recurring sporting events established in 2005
2005 establishments in Scotland